Jacob of Edessa (or James of Edessa) (c. 640 – 5 June 708) was Bishop of Edessa and prominent Syriac Christian writer in Classical Syriac language, also known as one of earliest Syriac grammarians. In various works, he treated theological, liturgical, canonical, philosophical and historical subjects, and contributed significantly to scholarly and literary development of Syriac Christianity. He is considered to be one of the most important scholars of the Christian-Aramean tradition.

Life
Jacob of Edessa was born in Aindaba (Arabic: عيندابا) at 50 km west of Aleppo, around 640. He studied at the famous monastery of Qenneshre (on the left bank of the Euphrates) and later at Alexandria.

On his return from Alexandria he became a monk at Edessa, where he was known for his learning. Ordained a priest in 672, he was appointed metropolitan of Edessa by his friend Athanasius II, Patriarch of Antioch. He held this office for three or four years, but the clergy opposed his strict enforcement of the Church canons. He was not supported by Julian II, the successor of Athanasius. In response to Julian's suggestion that he temporize his criticisms, he publicly burned a copy of the neglected canons in front of Julian's residence and retired to the monastery of Kaisum near Samosata. From there to the monastery of Eusebona where, for eleven years, he taught the Psalms and the reading of the Scriptures in Greek. Towards the close of this period Jacob again encountered opposition, this time from monks who despised the Greeks.

Jacob left Eusebona and proceeded to the great convent of Tel Ade (Arabic: تل عدا), one of several Syriac Orthodox monasteries on the 'mountain of Edessa' (? modern Tellgdi, northwest of Aleppo), where he spent nine years in revising and amending the Peshitta version of the Old Testament with the aid of the various Greek versions. Jacob played a prominent part in the synod Julian convened in 706.

He was finally recalled to the bishopric of Edessa in 708, but died four months later.

Doctrinal allegiance

Jacob belonged to the Syriac Orthodox Church and his writings have a definite Miaphysite character. In the literature of his country he holds much the same place as St. Jerome does among the Latins. Assemani tried hard to prove him orthodox (B.O. i. 470 sqq.) but changed his opinion on reading his biography by Barhebraeus (ib. ii. 3–7). See especially Lamy, Dissert. de Syrorum fide, pp. 206 sqq. i Text at Leipzig 1889 (Das Buch der Erkenntniss der Wahrheit oder der Ursache aller Ursachen): translation (posthumously) at Strassburg 1893.

Language
Jacob of Edessa wrote in Classical Syriac language, a literary and liturgical variant of Aramaic, that originated in the region of Osroene, centered in Edessa, and flourished from the 3rd to the 8th century, as standardized language of Syriac Christianity. His translations of various Greek works into Classical Syriac, followed by formation of appropriate terms and expressions, contributed significantly to the overall development of his native language.

Since he was born in Syria proper, whose local dialect was somewhat different from the literary language, those distinctions made him interested in questions related to dialectal diversities of Aramaic language, and he expressed that interest in his linguistic works. Preserved  fragments contain several terms, used by Jacob as designations for his language. When referring to our language, as native language of "us Arameans or Syriacs", he used several regional designations, like Nahrayan language (mamlā nahrāyā, leššānā nahrāyā), a term derived from choronym (regional name) Bet-Nahrayn, an Aramaic name for Mesopotamia in general. When referring even more directly to the literary language, he used the term Urhayan language (mamlā urhāyā, leššānā urhāyā), derived from the Aramaic name (Urhay) of the city of Edessa, that was the birthplace of Classical Syriac. Since he belonged to generation that already accepted the long-standing Greek custom of using Syrian/Syriac labels as designations for Arameans and their language, he also used term Syriac language (sūryāyā), as a designation for the language of his people in general, both literary and vernacular.

Writings

Most of his works are in prose.  Few have been published.  In 1911 most of the information available was to be found in Giuseppe Simone Assemani's Bibliotheca Orientalis and Wright's Catalogue of Syriac MSS in the British Museum.

Biblical works and commentaries

Jacob produced a revision of the Bible, based on the Peshitta.  Wright calls this a curious eclectic or patchwork text. Five volumes survive in Europe (Wright, Catalogue 38). This was the last attempt at a revision of the Old Testament in the Syriac Orthodox Church. Jacob was also the chief founder of the Syriac Massorah among the Syrians, which produced such manuscripts as the one (Vat. cliii.) described by Wiseman in Horae syriacae, part iii.

He also wrote commentaries and scholia on the Bible.  Specimens of these are given by Assemani and Wright. They are quoted a lot by later commentators, who often refer to Jacob as the "Interpreter of the Scriptures".

He also wrote a Hexahemeron, or treatise on the six days of creation. Manuscripts of this exist at Leiden and at Lyon. It was his last work, and being left incomplete was finished by his friend George, bishop of the Arabs.

He translated the apocryphal History of the Rechabites composed by Zosimus from Greek into Syriac (Wright, Catalogue 1128, and Nau in Revue semitique vi. 263, vii. 54, 136).

Canons and Liturgy

Jacob made a collection of ecclesiastical canons.  In his letter to the priest Addai we possess a collection of canons from his pen, given in the form of answers to Addai's questions. These were edited by Lagarde in Reliquiae juris eccl. syriace, pp. 117 sqq. and Thomas Joseph Lamy in Dissert. pp. 98 sqq.

Additional canons were given in Wright's Notulae syriacae.

All of them have been translated and expounded by Carl Kayser, Die Canones Jacobs von Edessa (Leipzig, 1886).

He also made many contributions to Syriac liturgy, both original and as translations from Greek. As a liturgical author, Jacob drew up an anaphora, or liturgy, revised the Liturgy of St. James, wrote the celebrated "Book of Treasures", composed orders of baptism, of the blessing of water on the eve of the Epiphany, and of the celebration of matrimony, to which may be added his translation of Severus's order of Baptism.

Philosophy

Jacob's chief original contribution was his Enchiridion or Manual, a tract on philosophical terms (Wright, Catalogue 984).

Translations of works of Aristotle have been attributed to him.  However these are probably by other hands (Wright, Short History p. 149; Duval, Littérature syriaque, pp. 255, 258).

The treatise De cause omnium causarum, which was the work of a bishop of Edessa, was formerly attributed to Jacob; but the publication of the whole by Kayser has made it clear that the treatise is of much later date.

History

Jacob also wrote a Chronicle, as a continuation of the Chronicon of Eusebius.  This is described and quoted from by Michael the Syrian in book 7 of his own Chronicle. John of Litharb wrote a continuation of Jacob's chronicle down to 726, also described by Michael.

The original text of Jacob's continuation has unfortunately perished apart from 23 leaves in a manuscript in the British Library. Of these a full account is given in Wright, Catalogue 1062, and an edition of these has been published in CSCO by E.W.Brooks.

Grammar

Jacob is most famous because of his contributions to the Syriac language and the West Syriac script (Serto).

In early Syriac vowels are either not shown, or else shown by a system of dots, used erratically.  Jacob borrowed five vowel signs from Greek, which he wrote above the line as miniature symbols.  This caught on, and is a feature of West Syriac writing even today.  He also elaborated the system whereby some consonants could stand for vowels.

Jacob also tried to introduce the Greek practice of writing the vowels on the line, the same way as is done for the consonants.  This was resisted by his countrymen and did not come into effect.

In his letter to George, bishop of Serugh, on Syriac orthography (published by Phillips in London 1869, and by Martin in Paris the same year) he sets forth the importance of fidelity by scribes in the copying of minutiae of spelling.

Other

As a translator Jacob's greatest achievement was his Syriac version of the Homiliae cathedrales of Severus, the monophysite patriarch of Antioch. This important collection is now in part known to us by E. W. Brooks's edition and translation of the 6th book of selected epistles of Severus, according to another Syriac version made by Athanasius of Nisibis in 669. (Pseudo-Dionysius of Tell-Mahre says 677; but Athanasius was patriarch only 684–687.)

A large number of letters by Jacob to various correspondents have been found in various MSS. Besides those on the canon law to Addai, and on grammar to George of Serugh referred to above, there are others dealing with doctrine, liturgy, and so forth. A few are in verse.

In 675, he revised Paul of Edessa's translations of the hymns of John Psaltes.

References

Sources

 
 
 
 
 
 
 
 
 
 
 
 
 
 
 
 
 
 
 
 
 
 
 
 
 
 
 
 
 
 
 
 

Syriac writers
7th-century Syriac Orthodox Church bishops
Bishops of Edessa
Syrian Oriental Orthodox Christians
Christian anti-Gnosticism
Year of birth uncertain
Christian apologists
640s births
708 deaths
8th-century Syriac Orthodox Church bishops
Arameans
7th-century people
Christians from the Umayyad Caliphate